Verticordia longistylis, commonly known as blue spruce verticordia is a flowering plant in the myrtle family, Myrtaceae and is endemic to the south-west of Western Australia. It is an irregularly-branched shrub with bluish-grey leaves and pale-coloured flowers with a long, protruding style. Although comparatively rare in the wild, it is one of the easiest verticordias to propagate and grow in most conditions.

Description

Flowering time is from December to June.

Taxonomy and naming
Verticordia longistylis was first formally described by Alex George in 1991 from a specimen he collected in the Fitzgerald River National Park and the description was published in Nuytsia. George derived the specific epithet (longistylis) "from the Latin longus (long) and stylus; the style is the longest in the genus".

George placed this species in subgenus Verticordia, section Infuscata along with V. oxylepis.

Distribution and habitat
This verticordia grows on exposed spongolite in the Fitzgerald River National Park in the Esperance Plains biogeographic region.

Conservation
 Verticordia longistylis is classified as "Priority Three" by the Western Australian Government Department of Parks and Wildlife, meaning that it is poorly known and known from only a few locations but is not under imminent threat.

Use in horticulture
Blue spruce verticordia is readily propagated from cuttings and can be grown in a range of soils, although it is slow growing and more open when grown in sand. Established plants are both frost and drought-hardy but can become straggly if not pruned. The flowers are insignificant except at close range and the bluish foliage is described as "attractive".

References

longistylis
Rosids of Western Australia
Eudicots of Western Australia
Plants described in 1991